The UEFA Women's U-19 Championship 2008 Final Tournament was held in France between 7–19 July 2008. Players born after 1 January 1989 were eligible to participate in this competition.

Qualification 
There were two qualification rounds.

Final tournament

Group stage

Group A

Group B

Knockout stage

Semifinals

Final

Awards

Goalscorers
4 goals
 Marie Pollmann

3 goals
 Toni Duggan
 Pamela Gueli

2 goals

  Eugénie Le Sommer
  Stefanie Mirlach
  Lisa Schwab
  Cristina Bonometti
  Alice Parisi

1 goal

  Jordan Nobbs
  Joana Flaviano
  Sara González
  Silvia Meseguer
  Rocío Ruiz
  Julie Machart
  Marina Hegering
  Kim Kulig
  Selina Wagner
  Alessandra Barreca
  Tatiana Bonetti
  Ida Elise Enget
  Hege Hansen
  Gunhild Herregården
  Maren Mjelde
  Ruesha Littlejohn
  Christie Murray
  Louise Fors
  Sofia Jakobsson
  Emmelie Konradsson
  Sara Sjöstedt

References

External links
Official website

Women's football competitions in France
2008
2008
Women
2008 in women's association football
2008–09 in French women's football
2008–09 in Italian women's football
2008 in Norwegian women's football
2008 in Swedish women's football
2008–09 in German women's football
2008–09 in Spanish women's football
2008–09 in English women's football
2008–09 in Scottish women's football
July 2006 sports events in Europe
2008 in youth association football